The phách) is a type of claves. A pair has two small wooden sticks which are beaten on a small bamboo platform to serve as percussion by the female vocalist during performances of ca trù "song with clappers", in Northern Vietnam.

References

Vietnamese musical instruments
Asian percussion instruments